Brunneria gracilis is a species of praying mantis found in Argentina, Brazil, Paraguay, Uruguay, and Venezuela.

References

G
Mantodea of South America
Insects of Brazil
Arthropods of Argentina
Invertebrates of Paraguay
Insects of Uruguay
Invertebrates of Venezuela
Insects described in 1915